Xerocrassa turolensis is a species of air-breathing land snail, a pulmonate gastropod mollusk in the family Geomitridae. This species is endemic to Spain, where it is restricted to the province of Teruel in the Aragon region.

References

turolensis
Molluscs of Europe
Endemic fauna of Spain
Gastropods described in 1963